Lutter am Barenberge is a former Samtgemeinde ("collective municipality") in the district of Goslar, in Lower Saxony, Germany. It was disbanded in November 2021, and its municipalities were absorbed by the town Langelsheim. It was situated northwest of the Harz, approx. 13 km northwest of Goslar. Its seat was in the town Lutter am Barenberge.

Geography 
The Samtgemeinde Lutter am Barenberge consisted of the following municipalities:
 Hahausen
 Lutter am Barenberge
 Wallmoden

Demographics

References 

Former Samtgemeinden in Lower Saxony
Goslar (district)